Sir John Hynde Cotton, 4th Baronet (1717 – 23 January 1795), of Madingley Hall, Cambridgeshire, was an English politician.

He was a Member (MP) of the Parliament of Great Britain for St Germans 1741 to 1747, for Marlborough 18 February 1752 to 1761 and for Cambridgeshire 22 March 1764 to 1780.

He married the heiress Anne Parsons (daughter of Humphrey Parsons) in 1754. The couple had two sons, Admiral Sir Charles Cotton (5th Baronet) and the Reverend Alexander Cotton.

References

1717 births
1795 deaths
People from South Cambridgeshire District
People educated at Westminster School, London
Alumni of Emmanuel College, Cambridge
Baronets in the Baronetage of England
British MPs 1741–1747
British MPs 1747–1754
British MPs 1754–1761
British MPs 1761–1768
British MPs 1768–1774
British MPs 1774–1780
Members of the Parliament of Great Britain for English constituencies
Members of the Parliament of Great Britain for constituencies in Cornwall